Morris Commercial Cars Limited was a British manufacturer of commercial vehicles formed by William Morris, founder of Morris Motors Limited, to continue the business of E G Wrigley and Company which he purchased as of 1 January 1924.

The marque was re-launched in 2017 when a proposal for all-new electric J-Type was announced, which was unveiled in November 2019.

History
Morris bought the assets of Soho, Birmingham axle manufacturer E.G. Wrigley and Company after it was placed in liquidation late in 1923.  Up until that point a small number of commercial vehicle variants of Morris cars were built at the Morris plant at Cowley, but with the newly acquired plant in Foundry Lane, Soho, Birmingham serious production began.

In 1932 the business was moved a few miles across Birmingham to the former Wolseley factory in Adderley Park.

In 1936 Morris sold the company into his Morris Motors Limited. The use of the Morris Commercial brand name continued until 1968 when British Motor Holdings, by then the parent of Austin as well as Morris, merged with the Leyland Motor Corporation to form the British Leyland Motor Corporation.

In wartime commercial vehicles in the Morris range were produced for military use – such as the Morris C8 field artillery tractor (FAT) and Morris CS8 15 cwt truck. Morris Commercial also built vehicles such as the Terrapin amphibious carrier

During the 1960s the light trucks and forward-control J4 light vans  produced by Austin and Morris commercial were identical.

While production of the light vans remained concentrated on the Birmingham Adderley Park site, production of the F-series and W-series light trucks moved to Scotland with the opening in 1960 of the company's Bathgate plant.  The Adderley Park plant was closed in 1971 and demolished shortly afterwards.

The light trucks in the 1960s included the FF, a forward-control design introduced in 1958, along with the WF which was a sibling vehicle with the driver placed behind the engine rather than on top of it.  The updated version of the FF, the FJ, appeared in 1964; it featured a split-circuit braking system, a novelty in this class of vehicle.   The FF remained in production and the two vehicles were offered side by side: in this class the BMC trucks were nevertheless out-competed in terms of domestic market sales volumes by Bedford and Ford (with their Thames).  Austin/Morris commercial vehicles in the 1960s also included the Austin/Morris FG-series an unusual-looking urban delivery truck with driver doors set at an angle at the rear corners of the cab to permit access in confined spaces.

In 2017, Morris Commercial Ltd announced a proposal to resurrect the Morris Commercial brand. It proposes an all-new electric J-Type light commercial vehicle with a real world range of over 120 miles and a top speed of around 90 mph.

Taxicabs

A new brand of London taxicab was announced on 9 February 1929. Built in accordance with New Scotland Yard regulations the new Morris-Commercial International taxicab was up to date and convenient in detail. Safety glass was fitted throughout, upholstery was real hide, a passenger need only press a button and speak in an ordinary voice and a microphone would communicate it to the driver.

The 4-cylinder engine, single dry plate clutch and four-speed gearbox were a unit like that on the standard 30cwt Morris-Commercial vehicle. Four wheel brakes would have been better, reported The Times but the rear brakes supplied were efficient, the steel artillery wheels detachable.

Carrying four passengers the taxicab had "plenty of speed" and four forward gears and was suitable for the country as well as London. The engine had side valves with tappets easily reached for adjustment, the generator and magneto being driven in tandem. The cooling water circulated naturally. Such parts as the carburettor were easily accessible. The speed lever worked in a visible gate with a stop for reverse. The three-quarter floating back axle was driven by overhead worm gear from an enclosed propellor shaft. The springs were semi-elliptical and beneath the frame, those in front were flat and splayed while those at the back were underhung. Shock absorbers were provided. The chassis weighed 18 cwt.

These vehicles were succeeded by Nuffield Oxford Taxis.

Vehicles
CDSW
C8 (1939-1945)
J-type (1949–1961)
J2 (1956–1967)
J4 (1960–1974)
250 JU (1967–1974)
JE (2021-)

Notes

External links

 https://www.morris-commercial.com/news-media/

Defunct motor vehicle manufacturers of the United Kingdom
Former defence companies of the United Kingdom
Organisations founded by Viscount Nuffield